The Japanese sturgeon, or Amur sturgeon (Acipenser schrenckii) is a species of fish in the family Acipenseridae found in the Amur River basin in China and Russia. Claims of its presence in the Sea of Japan need confirmation. The species has 11–16 dorsal, 34–47 lateral, and 7–16 ventral scutes. Their dorsal fins have 38–53 rays and 20–35 anal fin rays. They also have greyish-brown backs and pale ventral sides. The species could reach up to 3 m (9.8 ft) in length, and weight over 190 kg. The species is considered to be critically endangered.

Habitat and ecology
The Japanese sturgeon is benthic. Their main food sources are aquatic insect larvae, bone fish and mollusks. One study suggests that the type of aquatic insect larvae eaten by juvenile Japanese sturgeon depends on the season, where mayfly nymphs are eaten more frequently in Spring and Fall, and midge larvae are eaten more frequently in Summer. The females mature at 9–10 years of age, and males at 7–8 years. They start to migrate in the autumn. They live for 65 years.

References

Further reading

 Masuda, H., K. Amaoka, C. Araga, T. Uyeno and T. Yoshino (1984). The fishes of the Japanese Archipelago. Vol. 1 (text). Tokai University Press, Tokyo, Japan. 437 p. (text), 370 pls.
Journal Coll. Sci. Imp.Univ.,Tokyo, "23", (7).
Global Biodiversity Information Facility http://data.gbif.org/species/13576254/. Viewed 27 January 2010.

Acipenser
Fish of East Asia
Freshwater fish of China
Fish of Russia
Amur basin
Fish of Japan
Sea of Japan
Critically endangered fish
Critically endangered biota of Asia
Fish described in 1869